The Trophée Craven 'A', was the fifth round of the 1966 Trophées de France. This was held on the Bugatti au Mans, located in Le Mans, Maine, France, on 18 September. The following July, the circuit was home to the 1967 French Grand Prix, of which all three drivers on the podium that afternoon – Jack Brabham, Denny Hulme and Jackie Stewart – raced in this event.

Report

Entry
Despite the continued domination by the Brabham Racing Developments team, a total of 22 F2 cars were entered for the event. However, five cars did not arrive for qualifying.

Qualifying
Jack Brabham took pole position for the Brabham Racing Developments team, in a Brabham-Cosworth BT21, averaging a speed of 94.007 mph, around the  course.

Race
The race was held over 60 laps of the Le Mans Bugatti Circuit. Denny Hulme took the winner's spoils for the works Brabham team, driving their Brabham-Honda BT18. Hulme won in a time of 1hr 47:27.8mins., averaging a speed of 91.590 mph. Around 42 seconds behind was the second place car, driven by Frenchman, Jean-Pierre Beltoise, for the Matra Sports team in their Cosworth powered Matra MS5. The podium was completed by the second Frenchman, Eric Offenstadt, in a Lotus 44 of Ron Harris – Team Lotus, albeit one lap down.

Classification

Race Result

 Fastest lap: Hulme, 1:45.0ecs. (93.738 mph)

References

1966 in motorsport
Trophées de France
Formula Two races